27th Division or 27th Infantry Division may refer to:

Infantry divisions
 27th Division (United Kingdom)
 27th Infantry Division (United States)
27th Division (German Empire)
 27th Infantry Division (Wehrmacht), Germany
 27th SS Volunteer Division Langemarck, Germany
 27th Division (Imperial Japanese Army)
27th Mohammad Rasulullah Division, Iran
 27th Infantry Division Sila, Italy
 27th Infantry Division Brescia, Italy
 27th Division (North Korea)
 27th Infantry Division (Ottoman Empire)
 27th Infantry Division (Poland)
 27th Home Army Infantry Division (Poland)
27th Infantry Division (Russian Empire)
 27th Rifle Division (Soviet Union)
 27th Guards Rifle Division, Soviet Union
27th Infantry Division Savska, Yugoslavia
27th Division (Yugoslav Partisans)

Other divisions
27th Armored Division (United States)
27th Panzer Division (Wehrmacht), Germany
 27th Air Division, United States

See also
 27th Army (disambiguation)
 27th Battalion (disambiguation)
 27th Battalion (disambiguation)
 27th Brigade (disambiguation)
 XXVII Corps (disambiguation)
 27th Regiment (disambiguation)
 27 Squadron (disambiguation)